The Hippisley Baronetcy, of Warfield in the County of Berkshire, was a title in the Baronetage of Great Britain. It was created on 10 May 1796 for the diplomat and politician John Hippisley. The title became extinct on the death of his son, the second Baronet, in 1867.

Hippisley baronets, of Warfield (1796)
Sir John Coxe Hippisley, 1st Baronet (–1825)
Sir John Stuart Hippisley, 2nd Baronet (1790–1867)

References

Extinct baronetcies in the Baronetage of Great Britain